Pleione formosana, the Taiwan pleione or windowsill orchid, is a species of flowering plant in the family Orchidaceae, native to southeastern China as well as northern and central Taiwan. The pink flowers, borne in spring, have fringed white lips that are strongly marked and mottled with brown on the inner surface.

The specific epithet formosana refers to Taiwan's former name, Formosa.

This plant has gained the Royal Horticultural Society's Award of Garden Merit. In the UK it is rated as H3, which means that it can be grown outside in mild, sheltered areas where the soil does not dry out. It may also be grown under glass in a cool position.

References

Orchids of China
Orchids of Taiwan
formosana
Vulnerable plants
Taxonomy articles created by Polbot
Plants described in 1911